Elinor Norton is a 1934 American drama film directed by Hamilton MacFadden and written by Rose Franken and Philip Klein. It is based on the 1933 novel, The State versus Elinor Norton by Mary Roberts Rinehart. The film stars Claire Trevor, Gilbert Roland, Henrietta Crosman, Hugh Williams and Norman Foster. The film was released on November 2, 1934, by Fox Film Corporation.

Synopsis
While Elinor Norton's jealous husband Tony is away serving in trenches in World War I, she encounters the charming Brazilian Rene Alba who falls in love with her. When Tony returns from the war slightly shell-shocked she agrees to go away with him and live on a Texas ranch while he recovers, cutting off all contact with Rene. However he comes to visit the ranch, and Tony enjoys his company and invites him to stay and even wants him to become a partner in the ranch. Eventually when he discovers the secret love between them, a neurotic Tony points a gun at his head and accidentally wounds Elinor in the shoulder.

Cast

Claire Trevor as Elinor Norton
Gilbert Roland as Rene Alba
Henrietta Crosman as Christine Somers
Hugh Williams as Tony Norton
Norman Foster as Bill Carroll
 Andrea Leeds as 	Nurse 
 Cora Sue Collins as 	Betty, Little Girl 
 Landers Stevens as Conductor 
 Nora Lane as Publisher's Staff
 Renee Whitney as 	Publisher's Staff 
 Lucile Browne as 	Publisher's Staff 
 Jean Fenwick as 	Publisher's Staff 
 Marion Shilling as 	Publisher's Staff
 Polly Ann Young as	Publisher's Staff
 Grace Goodall as Publisher's Staff 
 Caryl Lincoln as 	Publisher's Staff 
 Susan Fleming as 	Publisher's Staff 
 Edwin Maxwell as	Army Doctor 
 Joe Rickson as 	Ranch Hand 
 Theodore von Eltz as Army Officer
 George Humbert as 	Ice Cream Vendor 
 Richard Tucker as 	Civilian Doctor

References

External links 
 

1934 films
Fox Film films
American drama films
American war films
1934 war films
1934 drama films
Films directed by Hamilton MacFadden
Films based on works by Mary Roberts Rinehart
American black-and-white films
Films set in the 1910s
American World War I films
Films set in France
Films set in Texas
1930s English-language films
1930s American films